Nemophora divina is a moth of the Adelidae family. It is found in continental China.

References

Moths described in 1939
Adelidae
Moths of Asia